The obokano (also spelled obukano) is a large bass bowl lyre from Kenya. It is used by the Gusii ethnic group. 

The instrument is made from a skin of a cow or goat and a bowl like structure curved out of a wood stump. It consists of eight strings whose tensions on the crossbar can be adjusted to produce different tones. It has been described as "the double-bass of East Africa."

References

Further reading
Hyslop, Graham. "Some Musical Instruments of Kenya." African Arts, vol. 5, no. 4 (Summer 1972), pp. 48-55.
Varnum, John P. "The Obokano of the Gusii: A Bowl Lyre of East Africa." Ethnomusicology, vol. 15, no. 2. (May 1971), pp. 242-248.

External links
Obokano audio sample
Obokano video
Obokano video

Lyres
Kenyan musical instruments